The Cadillac XTS (short for X-Series Touring Sedan) is a full-size, four-door, five-passenger, front-wheel drive or all-wheel drive luxury sedan from Cadillac based on an enlarged version of the Epsilon II platform shared with the Buick Lacrosse and Chevrolet Impala — and manufactured from 2013–2019 over a single generation.

Replacing the smaller Cadillac STS and larger DTS, production began in May 2012 at the Oshawa Assembly Plant and launched in June as a 2013 model. Marketed with left-hand drive in the United States, Canada, Mexico, China, and the Middle East (except Israel), the XTS was also assembled by Shanghai GM, with production beginning in February 2013.

Interior 

In addition to the base XTS, there are five trim packages labeled "Luxury", "Premium Luxury", and "Platinum", with the optional XTS V-Sport offered in both "V-Sport Premium Luxury" and "V-Sport Platinum".  Some of the standard features include dual-zone automatic climate control, 4G LTE connectivity, adaptive cruise control, keyless entry, leather seat-upholstery, 8-way power front seats, parking assist and comprehensive safety equipment like ABS, stability control, dual-stage front airbags, front side airbags, side-curtain airbags front and rear, and a driver side knee airbag.  

Optional equipment and technology is extensive, including separate climate controls for rear seat passengers, coupled with 8" LCD screens that flip up from the front passenger seat-backs, allowing an internal DVD player to display content with wireless headphones. The interior can be outfitted in a large assortment of color combinations, along with four types of wood selections. Cadillac's CUE system is standard with an 8-speaker Bose sound system, including HD Radio and SiriusXM. An optional 14-speaker Bose sound package includes AudioPilot noise compensation technology.

Powertrain 
The XTS is available in both front-wheel drive and optional all-wheel drive (standard on V-Sport vehicles) which includes a limited slip differential and torque vectoring.

Facelift 
For 2018, the XTS received a midcycle refresh including new front and rear styling.

Other versions
A long-wheelbase version XTS, called the XTS-L, as well as limousine and hearse versions were available for fleet and coachbuilder markets, however they are no longer manufactured as of late 2019.

XTS Platinum concept

General Motors exhibited a concept sedan called the XTS Platinum at the 2010 North American International Auto Show after privately unveiling the vehicle to automotive journalists on August 11, 2009. Its interior was based on hand-cut-and-sewn materials and uses Organic Light Emitting Diode (OLED) displays in place of traditional gauges and screens. A Platinum version of the production XTS went on sale in 2013.

Sales

See also
Cadillac CT6

References

External links

 
 Press release: Cadillac Unveils the XTS Platinum Concept

XTS
Cars introduced in 2012
2010s cars
Sedans
Full-size vehicles
Luxury vehicles
Executive cars
Flagship vehicles
Front-wheel-drive vehicles
All-wheel-drive vehicles
Limousines